The following is a list of Galatasaray S.K footballers based in Istanbul, Turkey.

Key
The list is ordered first by date of debut, and then if necessary in alphabetical order.
Appearances as a substitute are included.
Statistics are correct up to and including the match played on 17 March 2023. Where a player left the club permanently after this date, his statistics are updated to his date of leaving.

Players

Players highlighted in bold are still actively playing at Galatasaray.

References

External links
Galatasaray Sports Club Official Website 
Statistics at mackolik.com 
Statistics at weltfussball.de 
Statistics at tff.org 

 

 
Galatasaray S.K.
Association football player non-biographical articles